Robert "Bobby" Keith Hillin Jr. (born June 5, 1964) is an American stock car racing driver. He is a former competitor in NASCAR's Winston Cup and Busch Series, and once held the record for being the youngest driver ever to win a Winston Cup Series event.

Racing career
Born in Midland, Texas, Hillin began his career in racing by watching his father's IndyCar team, Longhorn Racing, compete in United States Auto Club-sanctioned sprint car racing and IndyCar events. An all-district linebacker in high school, he began his stock car career at the age of 13 and soon after won the track championship at Odessa Speedbowl in Odessa, Texas, and attended the Buck Baker Driving School at the age of 16.

Hillin made his debut in NASCAR Winston Cup Series competition at the age of 17, driving a car owned and sponsored by his family and crewed by Harry Hyde in the 1982 Northwestern Bank 400 at North Wilkesboro Speedway to a 21st-place finish. Hillin moved to North Carolina to further his career, continuing his education through correspondence courses; he graduated from high school the day before the 1983 Coca-Cola World 600; in 1984 he joined Stavola Brothers Racing, and in 1986 became the youngest winner in NASCAR's "modern era" when he won the Talladega 500 for the team, at the age of 22 years, 1 month and 22 days.

Despite the win, and two wins in the NASCAR Busch Series in 1988 and 1989 driving for Highline Racing, Hillin's career took a downturn; he would later say he was not mature enough to deal with the pressures of being a NASCAR winner. He left the Stavola Brothers team after the 1990 season; he started the 1991 season qualifying a backup car for Moroso Racing fastest in third-round time trials for the Daytona 500. A seventh-place finish in the 500 won Hillin the team's regular ride, however after ten races a lack of sponsorship forced the team to cut back its schedule, and Hillin was released; After two races with Jimmy Means Racing, Hillin was named as substitute driver for Kyle Petty, who had broken his leg earlier in the year in a wreck at Talladega; he drove eight races in the Team SABCO No. 42 before Petty returned.

Hillin then joined Team Ireland late in the 1991 season, and then for a partial season in 1992. When the team closed late in 1992 after being disqualified at the October Charlotte race, Hillin moved to Donlavey Racing, running the full 1993 season for the team. After three races in 1994, Hillin resigned from the team; Hillin ran a partial schedule the rest of the year for Charles Hardy Racing and Moroso Racing, then attempted two races early in 1995 for Moroso, before joining Jasper Motorsports twelve races into the 1995 season, replacing Davy Jones. Hillin remained with the team through 1996 and into 1997. Hillin also competed in the Suzuka Thunder Special, an exhibition race held at Suzuka Circuit in Japan following the 1996 season; he finished seventh in the event. He was released from the team after failing to qualify for the 1997 Coca-Cola 600; he continued to drive for the team through the Pocono 500 before being replaced by Morgan Shepherd. Later that year Hillin attempted three races for Triad Motorsports, failing to qualify for any; he would only drive one further Winston Cup race in his career, at Bristol Motor Speedway in 2000 for Melling Racing, substituting for an injured Stacy Compton.

Hillin restarted his own Busch Series team for the 1998 season, including five Major League Baseball players in the team's ownership; the team underperformed, and after the 2000 season he chose to go into semi-retirement, having decided to go into business in his native Texas. In 2008 Hillin returned briefly to competition, driving at Kansas Speedway in the Nationwide Series for MacDonald Motorsports; he drove one additional race for the team in the series at Texas Motor Speedway in 2009, but then retired for good from the sport.

Personal life
Hillin is married to Jamie Patterson of Austin, Texas. He is currently the CEO of T-Rex Engineering & Construction, providing services to the Gulf of Mexico's oil drilling industry.  

Hillin's oldest son, Luke Hillin, is Director of Operations for Men's Basketball at Texas A&M University. Luke Hillin resides in College Station, Texas with his wife, Maddie Hillin, and their two children, Charlotte Hillin and Walker Hillin.  

Hillin’s daughter, Stephanie Hillin, graduated from The University of Texas at Austin in 2017 and thereafter earned her law degree in 2019. Stephanie Hillin resides in Houston, Texas.   

Hillin's youngest son, Joseph Hillin, is a decorated graduate of The University of Georgia and is a stud analyst. Joseph Hillin resides in Dallas, Texas.

Motorsports career results

NASCAR
(key) (Bold – Pole position awarded by qualifying time. Italics – Pole position earned by points standings or practice time. * – Most laps led.)

Winston Cup Series

Daytona 500

Nationwide Series

References

External links
 

1964 births
Living people
NASCAR drivers
NASCAR team owners
People from Midland, Texas
Racing drivers from Texas